Plešivica pri Žalni (in older sources also Plešivice) is a settlement south of Žalna in the Municipality of Grosuplje in central Slovenia. The area is part of the historical region of Lower Carniola. The municipality is now included in the Central Slovenia Statistical Region.

Name
The name of the settlement was changed from Plešivica to Plešivica pri Žalni in 1953.

Cultural heritage
There is a three-storey shrine with a sculpture of Saint Lawrence in its main niche in centre of the village. It dates to the late 18th century.

References

External links

Plešivica pri Žalni on Geopedia

Populated places in the Municipality of Grosuplje